Julian Emery is a British musician, producer and songwriter, best known for his work with McFly, Nothing But Thieves and Lissie.

Early life
Emery was raised and educated in Buckinghamshire, the son of classical musician Terry Emery, and brother of actor Tania Emery

Inspired by rock bands like Rush and AC/DC, Emery began his career as a rock guitar player, but while still in his teens, gained production experience making albums of the scores to popular musicals.

Career
In the late 1990s, Emery was one of Britain's most prominent session guitarists, appearing on stage and on record with many pop acts, including Enrique Iglesias, Atomic Kitten, Kym Marsh, Blue and Annie Lennox.

In 2005, he developed a partnership with the former lead singer of British rock band, A, Jason Perry. They co-wrote and produced Don't Let It Go To Waste, the solo album by Matt Willis, formerly of Busted in 2006. The album produced one top 10 and two top 20 singles that year. The team co-wrote and produced Motion In The Ocean by McFly, which went platinum in the UK and included three No 1 singles including Please Please, Stargirl and Transylvania.

Since then Emery has emerged as a songwriter and producer, dividing his time between the UK and US.
Julian is Managed by Mark Wood, Radius Music Ltd.

Discography

External links
Radius Music

References

Living people
People from Buckinghamshire
English record producers
English songwriters
English rock guitarists
Year of birth missing (living people)
Place of birth missing (living people)